Henry Newton "Harry" Smith (May 30, 1935 – July 20, 2020) was a Canadian professional ice hockey defenceman.

Smith represented Canada at the 1961, 1962, and 1963 World Ice Hockey Championships, winning a gold medal in 1961 and silver in 1962.

Smith died on July 20, 2020, aged 85.

References

External links

Canadian ice hockey defencemen
Ice hockey people from British Columbia
2020 deaths
Portland Buckaroos players
Seattle Americans players
Spokane Comets players
Spokane Spokes players
Sportspeople from Trail, British Columbia
Trail Smoke Eaters players
Vancouver Canucks (WHL) players
1935 births